Disha Patani (born 13 June 1992) is an Indian actress who is known for her work in Hindi films. She began her acting career with the Telugu film Loafer (2015). She had her first Hindi film release with the biopic M.S. Dhoni: The Untold Story (2016), for which she won the Stardust Award for Superstar of Tomorrow – Female and the IIFA Award for Star Debut of the Year – Female.

Patani subsequently played the leading lady in the Chinese action comedy Kung Fu Yoga (2017) and the Hindi films Baaghi 2 (2018), Bharat (2019), Malang (2020) and Ek Villain Returns (2022).

Early life and family 
Patani was born on 13 June 1992/1993, in Bareilly, Uttar Pradesh. She is a Kumaoni, from a Rajput background. Her father, Jagadish Singh Patani is a police officer and her mother is a health inspector. Her elder sister, Khushboo Patani is a lieutenant in Indian Army. She also has a younger brother, Suryansh Patani. She studied engineering at Amity University, Lucknow.  She was the first runner up of Pond's Femina Miss India Indore 2013.

Career

Early work (2015–2018) 
Patani debuted with a Telugu film, Loafer alongside Varun Tej in 2015. She played the role of Mouni, a girl who runs from home to escape a forced marriage. Directed by Puri Jagannadh and produced by C. Kalyan under C.K. Entertainment, the film was made on a budget of 200 million and performed poorly at the box office with a lifetime collection of 106 million. In the following year, Disha appeared in a music video, Befikra along with Tiger Shroff which was produced by Bhushan Kumar and Krishan Kumar under T-Series and composed by Meet Bros. Written and directed by Meet Bros, the singer, Aditi Singh Sharma lent her voice.

Patani found her commercial break with Neeraj Pandey's M.S. Dhoni: The Untold Story, a biographical sports film based on the life story of MS Dhoni, the former captain of the Indian Cricket Team along with Sushant Singh Rajput and Kiara Advani. She played the role of Priyanka Jha, the girlfriend of MS Dhoni's character who dies in a car accident. In addition, she also starred in Jackie Chan's Kung Fu Yoga, along with Sonu Sood.

Patani then acted in Baaghi 2 along with Tiger Shroff, a sequel to the 2016 film Baaghi starring Tiger Shroff and Shraddha Kapoor and the second installment of the Baaghi franchise. Produced by Sajid Nadiadwala and directed by Ahmed Khan, Baaghi 2 was released on 30 March 2018 worldwide and grossed approximately  worldwide.

Rise to prominence (2019–present) 

In June 2019, she appeared in the film Bharat starring Salman Khan and Katrina Kaif. Patani was seen as one of his leading ladies in an extended cameo appearance.The film was commercially successful but received mixed reviews. 

She started 2020 with the action thriller release Malang opposite Aditya Roy Kapur also starring Anil Kapoor and Kunal Khemu. The film was praised from critics for its music, action sequences, direction and cast performances, Malang has earned  worldwide thus becoming a commercial success. In March 2020, she appeared in a song in the film Baaghi 3 starring Tiger Shroff and Shraddha Kapoor, the third installment of the Baaghi franchise. 

Patani next appeared in Prabhu Deva's action film Radhe, in which she reunited with Salman Khan this time as his leading ladies. The film was released coinciding with Eid al-Fitr, as premium video on demand on Zee Plex through ZEE5, Though Radhe received highly negative reviews from critics and audiences alike, who criticized the story, screenplay, direction and VFX. It became a huge OTT success. With 4.2 Million views, it became the most watched OTT film on the day of release.  

In 2022, she starred in Mohit Suri's psychological thriller Ek Villain Returns alongside John Abraham, Tara Sutaria and Arjun Kapoor. The film opened to mixed reviews from critics and performed moderately at the box office. Sukanya Vema of Rediff wrote "Ek Villain Returns falls back on the popularity of the Galliyan track to boost its appeal".

Patani finished shooting for Karan Johar's Yodha opposite Sidharth Malhotra. In mid 2022, she has signed her Tamil debut film Suriya 42 alongside Suriya.

Media image 
Patani's debut was one of the most talked about debut of 2016. That year, she ranked fifth in the list of most searched celebrities on Google. She is often termed as the National Crush Of India. 

She is one of the most followed celebrities on social media with over 56.8 million massive Instagram followers.

Patani has featured in The Times of Indias Most Desirable Woman List, ranked at No. 19 in 2017 and No. 9 in 2018. Patani was named the Most Desirable Woman in year 2019 and ranked at No. 3 in 2020.

She's often referred as a sex symbol among the youth for her bold photoshoots and public appearances.

Filmography

Films 

 All films are in Hindi unless otherwise noted.

Music videos

Awards and nominations

Notes

References

External links 

 
 
 

Living people
People from Bareilly
Actresses from Uttar Pradesh
Kumaoni people
Indian film actresses
Actresses in Hindi cinema
Actresses in Telugu cinema
Actresses in Tamil cinema
1990s births
Age controversies
Screen Awards winners
International Indian Film Academy Awards winners
21st-century Indian actresses